Gulf Air Flight 771 was a flight from Karachi, Pakistan, to Abu Dhabi, United Arab Emirates. On 23 September 1983, while the Boeing 737-2P6 was on approach to Abu Dhabi International Airport, a bomb planted by Palestinian nationalist militant group, Abu Nidal Organization, exploded in the baggage compartment. The plane crashed in the desert near Jebel Ali between Abu Dhabi and Dubai in the UAE. All five crew members and 107 passengers died.

Crew and passengers
The flight's cockpit crew consisted of the following:

 Captain Saoud Al Kindy, an Oman citizen
 First officer Khazal Al Qadi, a Bahrain citizen

The cabin crew were of mixed nationalities, ranging from Filipino, Indian, Pakistani, and an American; the sole Bahraini member, Hashim Sayed Abdullah, acted as a deputy purser and worked in the economy class cabin. Two of the crew were from the United Kingdom; one of them, Sally Anne Townsend, was a native of Peterborough, serving as chief purser on the flight. 

There were 96 Pakistani nationals, many returning to jobs in Abu Dhabi and Bahrain after spending the Eid al Adha holiday with their families in Pakistan. There were also seven passengers from the United Kingdom, one from the United States, and one from Iran.

Bombing 
The bomb explosion led to a fire in the baggage compartment. Despite this, the crew managed to send a short distress signal. The aircraft then crashed into the ground, killing all 112 people on board.

Investigation
The investigation was carried out by the American National Transportation Safety Board (NTSB), and they released a 400-page report on their findings, which was not immediately published in the Persian Gulf region. The report was revealed in September 1987 by British politician Sir Dudley Smith, under pressure from the parents of Lyn Farthing, one of the two British flight attendants who perished in the crash. 

The report included a description of the last moments in the cockpit, including a description of Omani captain Saoud Al Kindy praying as the plane nose-dived into the desert. The report mentioned that everything on board the flight was perfectly normal and voice transcripts showed the crew chatting among themselves. One asked the other if he was on duty the next day, to which he replied "No, I've got a day off tomorrow". That was followed by a sudden interruption and the recording showed the pilots making a frantic attempt to control the plane.

The report indicated a bomb in the baggage hold as the primary cause of the accident, due to the following factors:

 A passenger who checked in baggage at Karachi but never boarded the plane.
 The nature of injuries to passengers who were seated above the baggage hold.
 A sudden interruption to an otherwise normally operating flight.
 Data obtained from the aircraft's flight data recorder.

Aftermath
The bomb was apparently planted by the Abu Nidal Organization (named after Abu Nidal himself), to convince Saudi Arabia to pay protection money to Nidal so as to avoid attacks on their soil.

Death certificates issued for the passengers on board showed the cause of death as asphyxiation.

As of January 2022, Gulf Air still uses the flight number 771, operating scheduled services between Islamabad and Bahrain.

See also

 Gulf Air Flight 072, which crashed into the sea on approach to Bahrain International Airport.

References

External links
 
 A picture of the Gulf Air A4O-BK that crashed – Airliners.net
Abu Nidal behind 1983 Gulf Air bombing: Aide (Archive)

1983 in the United Arab Emirates
Murder in the United Arab Emirates
Abu Nidal attacks
Accidents and incidents involving the Boeing 737 Original
Airliner bombings
Aviation accidents and incidents in 1983
Aviation accidents and incidents in the United Arab Emirates
Gulf Air accidents and incidents
Mass murder in 1983
Terrorist incidents in the United Arab Emirates
Terrorist incidents in Asia in 1983
Pakistan–United Arab Emirates relations
September 1983 events in Asia
1983 murders in Asia
1983 disasters in the United Arab Emirates